David Ioan Țone (born 5 October 2004) is a Romanian professional footballer who plays as a defender.

Club career

Dinamo București

He made his Liga I debut for Dinamo București against FC U Craiova 1948 on 26 July 2021, when he replaced Roberto Diniță in the 64th minute, under manager Dario Bonetti. During the 2021-2022 season, he also came in the 74th minute in the away game against CFR Cluj, replacing Răzvan Grădinaru. At the end of the season, Dinamo București was relegated to Liga II for the first time in history.

Țone started the 2022-2023 Liga II season as a first team regular, playing in the first two games of the season, before being relegated on the bench by manager Ovidiu Burcă following the 3-1 defeat against Oțelul Galați and the arrival of more experienced defenders in the team.

Career statistics

Club

References

External links

 David Țone at lpf.ro

2004 births
Living people
Footballers from Bucharest
Romanian footballers
Association football defenders
FC Dinamo București players
Liga I players
Romania youth international footballers